Grammitis diminuta  is a fern in the family Polypodiaceae. The Latin specific epithet diminuta means "decreased" or "diminished", with reference to the tapered frond base.

Description
The plant is an epiphytic fern. It has a stout, erect rhizome with light brown, lanceolate scales. Its simple fronds combine a short stipe with a narrowly elliptic lamina 3–15 cm long and 0.4–0.8 cm wide.

Distribution and habitat
The fern is endemic to Australia’s subtropical Lord Howe Island in the Tasman Sea; it is confined to the cloud forest on the upper slopes and summits of Mounts Lidgbird and Gower.

References

diminuta
Epiphytes
Endemic flora of Lord Howe Island
Plants described in 1952
Ferns of Australia
Taxa named by John Gilbert Baker
Taxa named by Edwin Copeland